In enzymology, a nucleoside phosphoacylhydrolase is an enzyme that catalyzes the chemical reaction

Hydrolyses mixed phospho-anhydride bonds

This enzyme belongs to the family of hydrolases, specifically those acting on acid anhydrides in phosphorus-containing anhydrides.  The systematic name of this enzyme class is nucleoside-5'-phosphoacylate acylhydrolase.

References

 

EC 3.6.1
Enzymes of unknown structure